Forbesganj subdivision is an administrative subdivision out of two subdivisions of Araria district in the state of Bihar, India. It comprises 6 Blocks of Araria The headquarter of the subdivision is in Forbesganj town.

Etymology
During the British Raj the area was under the administration of a British district collector and municipal commissioner, Alexander John Forbes (1807-1890) of East India Company. Forbes had a bungalow at the same location. Consequently the area was known as 'residential area' also abbreviated as 'R-area'. Over time, the name transformed to 'Araria' and the neighbouring subdivision came to be known as 'Forbesganj'.

Health
Sub divisional Hospital Forbesganj is located near the Subdivision Office, Forbesganj

Blocks of Forbesganj subdivision
 Forbesganj
 Narpatganj
 Bhargama

References

Subdivisions in Araria district
Subdivisions of Bihar